Alexei Anatolevich Semenov (born April 10, 1981) is a Russian former professional ice hockey defenceman. He played in the National Hockey League (NHL) and the Kontinental Hockey League (KHL). Semenov was selected by the Edmonton Oilers in the second round of the 1999 NHL Entry Draft, 36th overall.

Playing career
In 2001, Semenov was awarded the Max Kaminsky Trophy as the best defenceman in the Ontario Hockey League (OHL). After playing three full seasons for the Oilers and their top farm club, the Hamilton Bulldogs, he was traded to the Florida Panthers for a conditional draft pick in the 2006 NHL Entry Draft on November 19, 2005. Upset at his assignment to the Rochester Americans at the start of the 2006–07 season, Semenov left Rochester after four games to play for Salavat Yulaev Ufa in Russia. On July 27, 2007, Semenov signed a one-year contract with the San Jose Sharks.

Semenov was invited to training camp with the New York Rangers for the 2009–10 season and was offered a one-year contract before the season to serve as the team's seventh defenseman. Semenov turned down the contract based on the amount of money offered, countering Rangers General Manager Glen Sather's claim that Semenov's wife talked him out of it after he had already agreed to terms.
Subsequently, less than a week later, Semenov signed a two-year contract worth $1.5 million with Dynamo Moscow. The following season, Semenov was again invited to the Rangers training camp, and accepted.

Career statistics

Awards and honors 
2004 National Hockey League All-Star Game

 2000-2001
 First Team All-Star in the OHL and a Third Team All-Star in the CHL.
 OHL Most Outstanding Defenseman (Max Kaminsky Trophy) 
 2009 NHL President Trophy (San Jose Sharks)
 2010-2011
 Spengler Cup Winner (SKA St. Petersburg) 
 2014-2015
 KHL Defenseman of the Month (January)

References

External links

1981 births
Living people
Edmonton Oilers draft picks
Edmonton Oilers players
Florida Panthers players
Hamilton Bulldogs (AHL) players
HC Dynamo Moscow players
People from Murmansk
Rochester Americans players
Russian ice hockey defencemen
Salavat Yulaev Ufa players
San Jose Sharks players
SKA Saint Petersburg players
HC Sochi players
Sudbury Wolves players
HC Vityaz players
Sportspeople from Murmansk Oblast